Madim-e Olya (also Romanized as Madīm-e ‘Olyā; also known as Madīm, and Madīn) is a village in Qaleh Asgar Rural District, Lalehzar District, Bardsir County, Kerman Province, Iran. At the 2006 census, its population was 88, in 27 families.

References 

Populated places in Bardsir County